Ross Creek, Nova Scotia  is a community in Kings County, Nova Scotia, Canada.

References

Communities in Kings County, Nova Scotia